Ahsan Ramzan is a Pakistani snooker player. In March 2022, Ramzan has set a new record for amateur snooker and become the 2nd youngest player after Chinese player Yan Bingtao at world amateur snooker champion in the world. He represented Pakistan at the 2022 World Games held in Birmingham, United States.

Career finals

Amateur finals: 2 (1 title)

References

Living people
Pakistani snooker players
Year of birth missing (living people)
21st-century Pakistani people
Competitors at the 2022 World Games